The Harder Hotel is a historic hotel building in Scribner, Nebraska. It was built in 1901 by Fritz Stabenow for Hans Harder, a German immigrant from Schleswig-Holstein who first worked as a stonemason in Chicago before moving to Nebraska. The building was designed in the Rundbogenstil style by architect Frederick A. Henninger. It has been listed on the National Register of Historic Places since November 27, 1989.

References

National Register of Historic Places in Dodge County, Nebraska
Victorian architecture in Nebraska
Buildings and structures completed in 1901